Mary Hubler (born July 31, 1952) is an American attorney and Democratic politician.  She served 26 years in the Wisconsin State Assembly (1985–2011) representing Barron County and neighboring municipalities of northwest Wisconsin. 

She was the chair of the Committee on Ethics and Standards of Conduct and a member of the Committee on Veterans and Military Affairs, the Joint Committee for Review of Administrative Rules, and the Special Committee on State Trails Policy. She was the Co-Chair for both the Joint Survey Committee on Retirement Systems and the Joint Survey Committee on Tax Exemptions.

References

External links
Wisconsin Assembly - Representative Mary Hubler official government website
 
 Follow the Money - Mary Hubler
2008 2006 2004 2002 2000 1998 campaign contributions
Campaign 2008 campaign contributions at Wisconsin Democracy Campaign

1952 births
Living people
Women state legislators in Wisconsin
University of Wisconsin–Superior alumni
University of Wisconsin Law School alumni
21st-century American politicians
21st-century American women politicians
People from Rice Lake, Wisconsin
Democratic Party members of the Wisconsin State Assembly